Garagali (population c. 1,000) is a small village in Jajpur district, Odisha state, India. It is governed locally as a part of Kundal town. The village has two schools: Garagali UGME School and Malihasuni Bidyapitha Garagali High School, which is named after village goddess Maa Malihasuni. The hamlet also has a Brundaban Chandra temple, Maa Durga Mandap, where Durga Puja is celebrated annually.

Villages in Jajpur district